"Do You Remember Walter?" (also spelled "Do You Remember Walter") is a song by the English rock band the Kinks from their sixth studio album, The Kinks Are the Village Green Preservation Society (1968). Written and sung by Ray Davies, the song was recorded in July1968. The song's narrator describes an experience of running into old friend, only to find that the two no longer have anything to talk about. The song was directly inspired by a similar experience of Davies. As one of several character studies to appear on Village Green, the song is often characterised by commentators as central to the album's themes of nostalgia and loss. Retrospective commentators have described it as one of Davies's best compositions.

Background and composition 

Ray Davies was inspired to compose "Do You Remember Walter" after running into an old friend and finding they didn't have anything to talk about. The friend directly inspired the song's character Walter. The song's narrator recalls his various exploits with Walter, such as playing cricket in the rain and smoking cigarettes together, and remembers a childhood promise they made to one another that they would sail away to sea. In the second half of the song, the singer's idealised memory of his friend is broken when he sees him as fat, married and what band biographer Johnny Rogan terms "irredeemably grown up". The singer mocks the older friend's early bedtime, while Walter is uninterested in his reminiscing of the past.

"Do You Remember Walter" is one of the songs thematically central to the Kinks' 1968 album The Kinks Are the Village Green Preservation Society; Miller considers it the album's "lyrical heart", and Rogan writes it centres on the album's themes of nostalgia and loss. Due to its examination of Walter, the song is one of several character studies which appear on Village Green. Rogan considers the song a departure from some of Davies's earlier compositions where he created idealised figures, focusing in particular on the 1967 song "David Watts". Rogan adds that while "David Watts" hero-worships in the present tense, the narrator of "Do You Remember Walter" instead contrasts the past and the present, conveying "a loss of almost tragic proportions" where the Walter character is "demythologised in adulthood." Academic Ken Rayes writes the song evokes the album's themes of English pastoral poetry, suggesting it is a variation on a convention in the genre in which a reader is addressed as an acquaintance and told about "a dead 'Golden Age' hero". In his November1968 interview with Melody Maker, Davies stated the song's closing line, "People often change but memories of people can remain", served to sum up the song's message.

"Do You Remember Walter" is a pop song with a subdued production, allowing for attention to remain on the lyrics. After opening with what Rogan terms "machine gun drumming", the song is defined by a dominant piano and bass guitar, alongside snare rolls, elements which English professor Thomas M. Kitts thinks represent the narrator's "assault" on the adult Walter and the present. The song employs a vertical melody which band biographer Andy Miller compares to a piano exercise.

Recording 

The Kinks recorded "Do You Remember Walter" in July1968 in Pye Studio 2, one of two basement studios at Pye Records' London offices. Davies is credited as the song's producer, while Pye's in-house engineer Brian Humphries operated the four-track mixing console. Davies's lead vocals are occasionally double tracked, and he sings in a tone of longing and regret. The recording employs a Mellotron – a tape-loop-based keyboard instrument – which mimics the sound of a horn section. The Mellotron follows the melody low in the mix, something Miller thinks contributes a rousing and melancholic effect. Davies mixed the recording quickly in August1968, but remixed it in lateOctober after the release of Village Green was delayed by two months.

Release and legacy 

Davies included "Do You Remember Walter" as the second track on his original twelve-track edition of The Kinks Are the Village Green Preservation Society, between "The Village Green Preservation Society" and "Picture Book". When he delayed the album's release by two months to expand it to fifteen tracks, "Do You Remember Walter" retained its sequence as second on the album. Pye released the fifteen-track edition of Village Green in the UK on 22 November 1968. In a contemporary review of the album for British music magazine Disc and Music Echo, the reviewer counted it as one of the most memorable songs on the album, adding that it "almost makes you want to cry, it's so sad!"

Reprise Records issued "The Village Green Preservation Society" backed with "Do You Remember Walter?" as an American single in July or August1969. The release coincided with Warner Bros. Records' "God Save the Kinks" promotional campaign, which sought to reestablish the band's status in America after their informal four-year performance ban was lifted in the country. The Kinks never added "Do You Remember Walter" to their concert set list. They performed two studio takes of the song at Konk recording studios on 11 April 1994. The sessions were played in an unplugged style and filmed for a BBC documentary. When the Kinks' 1994 album To the Bone was re-released in 1996 with a CD of extra material, the 1994 recording of "Do You Remember Walter" was among the songs added.

In a retrospective assessment, Morgan Enos of Billboard magazine characterised the song as a "Kinks classic", writing it "deftly captures how old friendships change". Among band biographers, Andy Miller counts it as one of Davies's best compositions, and Johnny Rogan thinks it is "one of his greatest songs of the era". English rock band Electric Light Orchestra later repurposed the song's drum and piano intro for their 1978 single "Mr. Blue Sky", and Graham Coxon of the English rock band Blur named it as sometimes his "favourite song ever".

Notes

References

Bibliography 

 
 
 
 
 
 
 
 
 
 
 
 
 
 
 
 
 
 
 
 
 

1968 songs
Songs written by Ray Davies
The Kinks songs
Song recordings produced by Ray Davies
Songs about nostalgia